Cilly Feindt (1909–1999) was a German circus performer, stage and film actress.

Selected filmography
 The Circus Princess (1925)
 The Field Marshal (1927)
 A Murderous Girl (1927)
 Endangered Girls (1928)
 The Circus Princess (1929)
 The Leap into the Void (1932)
 Holiday From Myself (1934)
 Light Cavalry (1935)
 Two Weeks in Another Town (1962)

References

Bibliography
 Perry, Joe. Christmas in Germany: A Cultural History. University of North Carolina Press, 2010.

External links

1909 births
1999 deaths
German film actresses
German silent film actresses
20th-century German actresses
Actresses from Berlin